Sir Simon Lovestone (born February 1961) is professor of translational neuroscience at the University of Oxford. He is a specialist in neurodegenerative disorders such as Alzheimer's disease and Parkinson's disease. He was made a knight bachelor in the 2017 Queen's Birthday Honours for services to neuroscience research.

References

Living people
20th-century British medical doctors
21st-century British medical doctors
British neurologists
British neuroscientists
Alzheimer's disease researchers
Parkinson's disease researchers
Medical scholars of the University of Oxford
Knights Bachelor
1961 births
Academics of King's College London
NIHR Senior Investigators